Localized lipodystrophy is a skin condition characterized by the loss of subcutaneous fat localized to sites of insulin injection.

See also 
 Lipodystrophy
 List of cutaneous conditions
 Skin lesion

References

External links 

Conditions of the subcutaneous fat